Ludomir (Polish: Ludomir, Czech: Ludomír, South Slavic: Ljudomir) - is a Slavic given name consists of two words: "Lud" - people and "mir" - peace, glory, prestige. Feminine forms:  Ludomira, Ljudomira, Ludomíra. May refer to:

Ludomir Benedyktowicz, a Polish painter
Ludomir Chronowski, Polish fencer
Ludomir Danilewicz, a Polish engineer and, for some ten years before the outbreak of World War II, one of the four directors of the AVA Radio Company in Warsaw, Poland
Ludomir Goździkiewicz, Polish politician
Ludomir Różycki, a Polish composer and conductor

Masculine given names
Slavic masculine given names
Czech masculine given names
Polish masculine given names